The Broadmoor Skating Club is a figure skating club based in Colorado Springs, Colorado that has long been a major training center for the sport of figure skating.  Founded in 1939, it was originally known as the Pikes Peak Skating Club, and was based in the Broadmoor World Arena on the grounds of The Broadmoor resort.  When that facility was demolished in 1994, the club moved to its current home at the Broadmoor World Arena (1998).

Notable skaters who trained at or represented the Broadmoor Skating Club include:

 Max Aaron
 Mirai Nagasu
 Jeremy Abbott
 Ryan Bradley
 Vincent Zhou
 Nicole Bobek
 Scott Davis
 Todd Eldredge
 Rachael Flatt
 Peggy Fleming
Isabella Flores & Dimitry Tsarevski
Piper Gilles
 Ryan Jahnke
 David Jenkins
 Hayes Alan Jenkins
 Vivian Joseph & Ronald Joseph
 Caryn Kadavy
 Karol & Peter Kennedy
 Alexa Scimeca Knierim & Chris Knierim
 Ann Patrice McDonough
 Keauna McLaughlin & Rockne Brubaker
 Melissa & Mark Militano
 Brandon Mroz
 Colleen O'Connor and Jim Millns
 Renée Roca & Gorsha Sur
 Elizabeth Punsalan & Jerod Swallow
 Garrett Swasey
 Jill Trenary
 Tiffany Vise & Derek Trent
 Stephanie Westerfeld
 Tim Wood
 Paul Wylie
 Eva Pawlik

Prominent coaches associated with the club have included Tom Dickson, Carlo Fassi, Sandy Hess, Dalilah Sappenfield, Edi Scholdan, and Tom Zakrajsek.  The club has benefitted in recent years from its proximity to both the United States Figure Skating Association headquarters and the United States Olympic Training Center in Colorado Springs.

The club hosted the U.S. Figure Skating Championships six times between 1948 and 1976, and the World Figure Skating Championships five times during the same period, at the Broadmoor World Arena facility.  More recently, the club has hosted events such as the World Junior Figure Skating Championships, the Four Continents Championships, Skate America, and the Grand Prix Final.

References

External links 
Broadmoor Skating Club

Figure skating clubs in the United States
Sports in Colorado Springs, Colorado
1939 establishments in Colorado